President of the Council of Ministers of the Mexican Empire, First Minister, or Chancellor was an institutional figure that existed in two moments of the national history of Mexico during the First Mexican Empire since 1822 to 1823 by Agustín de Iturbide and the Second Mexican Empire since 1864 to 1867 by Maximilian of Habsburg.

Appointment 
The president of the Council of Ministers was appointed by the emperor and had to be ratified by Congress in the case of the First Mexican Empire. The president of the Council holds the presidency of the Council although he may also be the holder of a Ministry of State, mainly the Ministry of Foreign Affairs. The other ministers were appointed by the emperor directly. For the validity of the norms and decrees issued by the emperor, the signatures of the prime minister and of the ministers of the portfolios related to the matter of such are necessary; Government acts that lack ministerial endorsement in a constitutional system are null.

Former holders of the title 

 Parties

First Empire

Second Empire

References 

Mexican Empire